Belleville is an unincorporated community in Lincoln County, in the U.S. state of Tennessee.

History
A post office called Belleville was established in 1891, and remained in operation until it was discontinued in 1902. The community was likely named for the Bell family of settlers.

References

Unincorporated communities in Lincoln County, Tennessee
Unincorporated communities in Tennessee